The 2021–22 Al Ahly season is the 114th season in the football club's history and 63rd consecutive and overall season in the top flight of Egyptian football, the Egyptian Premier League. In addition to the domestic league, Al Ahly also are participating in this season's editions of the domestic cup, the Egypt Cup,  and the first-tier African cup, the CAF Champions League and the FIFA Club World Cup.

Kit information
Supplier: Umbro
Sponsors: WE, SAIB Bank, GLC Paints, Tiger Chips, Royal Dutch Shell

Players

Current squad

Stats As of 21 January 2022

Youth Academy

Transfers

Transfers in

Transfers out

Loans out

Competitions

Overview

Egyptian Premier League

League table

Results summary

Results by round

Matches
The fixtures for the 2021–22 season were announced on 12 October 2021.

Egypt Cup

2020–21 Egypt Cup

2021–22 Egypt Cup

2022 EFA Cup

2022 EFA League Cup is the first edition of the EFA Cup, an annual knockout football competition for Egyptian Premier League clubs. Al Ahly played most of the matches with a squad mainly consists of youth team players.

Group stage

Matches

CAF Super Cup

CAF Champions League

Al Ahly entered the competition for the 24th consecutive time after winning the league and the CAF Champions League in the previous season. Al Ahly were ranked first in the CAF 5-year ranking prior to the start of the 2021–22 season. As a result, they entered the competition from the Second round.

Qualifying rounds

Second round

Group stage

Group A

Knockout stage

Quarter-finals

Semi-finals

Final

FIFA Club World Cup

Statistics

Goalscorers

Clean sheets

Notes

References

Al Ahly SC seasons
Egyptian football clubs 2021–22 season
2021–22 CAF Champions League participants seasons
2021 FIFA Club World Cup participants seasons